Regional elections were held in some regions of Italy during 1988. These included:

Aosta Valley on 26 and 27 June
Friuli-Venezia Giulia on 26 and 27 June
Trentino-Alto Adige on 20 November

Elections in Italian regions
1988 elections in Italy